James Justin Acker (born September 24, 1958) is a former Major League Baseball pitcher who played from  to . He played college baseball at the University of Texas.

He also played for the Seattle Mariners.

Professional career

Toronto Blue Jays
He was drafted by the Atlanta Braves in the first round (21st selection) of the 1980 Major League Baseball Draft.  On December 6, he was drafted by the Toronto Blue Jays from the Atlanta Braves in the  Rule 5 Draft.  He pitched for the Jays for four years performing mainly as a relief pitcher.

Atlanta Braves
On July 6, Acker was traded by the Blue Jays to the Atlanta Braves for pitcher Joe Johnson. He spent four years with the Braves,  compiling a record of 7–27 with 16 saves and a 3.71 ERA in 169 games.

On August 24, Acker was traded by the Braves back to the Toronto Blue Jays for Francisco Cabrera and Tony Castillo.

Toronto Blue Jays (second tenure)
Acker spent part of the  year and the complete  and  seasons back with the Blue Jays. In his entire seven-year career with the Jays he compiled a record of 26–22 with 14 saves and an ERA of 4.07 in 281 games. On October 31, he was granted free agency.

Seattle Mariners
Acker signed as a free agent with the Seattle Mariners on February 2, . He appeared in 17 games with the Mariners, compiling a 5.28 ERA, before he was released on July 21, .

Retirement
Acker ended his baseball career after six appearances with the Oklahoma City 89ers, the Texas Rangers Triple-A affiliate, in 1993.

Career statistics
In 467 major league games, Acker compiled a 33–49 record with 32 games started, 159 games finished, 30 saves, 329 walks, 482 strikeouts and a 3.97 ERA.

He was an excellent fielding pitcher, recording a .992 fielding percentage with only two errors in 236 total chances in 904.1 innings pitched. Both his miscues were against the Milwaukee Brewers on June 25, 1984, and September 24, 1989.

References

External links
, or Retrosheet, or Pelota Binaria (Venezuelan Winter League)

1958 births
Living people
American expatriate baseball players in Canada
Atlanta Braves players
Baseball players from Texas
Calgary Cannons players
Cardenales de Lara players
American expatriate baseball players in Venezuela
Greenville Braves players
Gulf Coast Braves players
Major League Baseball pitchers
Oklahoma City 89ers players
People from Freer, Texas
Richmond Braves players
Savannah Braves players
Seattle Mariners players
Texas Longhorns baseball players
Toronto Blue Jays players